Elizabeth Ernest-James (born 15 May 1946) is a Welsh former professional tennis player.

Ernest-James is the daughter of tennis player Barbara Ernest, who competed at Wimbledon in the 1950s. Like her mother, Ernest-James made several appearances at Wimbledon, twice playing in the singles second round.

In April 2022 Ernest-James appeared, with a collection of tennis dresses, on BBC's Antiques Roadshow.

References

External links
 
 

1946 births
Living people
British female tennis players
Welsh female tennis players